Samir Putatundu is a former CPI(M) leader from West Bengal state of India. He is the General Secretary of Party of Democratic Socialism (PDS).

Putatundu contested the Jadavpur assembly constituency in the 2011 West Bengal assembly election, running against incumbent Chief Minister Buddhadev Bhattacharya. Putatundu got 342 votes (0.17%).

References

Living people
Communist Party of India (Marxist) politicians from West Bengal
Party of Democratic Socialism (India) politicians
University of Calcutta alumni
1952 births